

The Old Federal Reserve Bank Building is a historic bank building located at 925 Chestnut Street on the corner of S. 10th Street in the Market East neighborhood of Philadelphia, Pennsylvania. The main section was designed by architect Paul Philippe Cret in the Classical Revival style influenced by the Beaux-Arts style, and was built between 1931 and 1935.  It incorporated the Penn Mutual Life Insurance Building, built in 1889, with additions made in 1918 and 1925.  Cret designed the formal gardens which were added in 1941 and in 1952–3, a recessed seventh story were added, designed by Harbeson, Hough, Livingston & Larson, the successor firm to Cret.  The building features sculptures of the goddess Athena made by Alfred-Alphonse Bottiau.

The building is 11 bays wide, measuring 170 feet wide and 113 feet deep, has a steel frame structure faced with Vermont marble, and has engaged piers.

It was added to the National Register of Historic Places in 1979. It is located on the East Center City Commercial Historic District.  The building is now part of the Center City campus of the Thomas Jefferson University Hospital.

Gallery

See also

References
Notes

External links

Bank buildings in Philadelphia
Market East, Philadelphia
Government buildings completed in 1952
Bank buildings on the National Register of Historic Places in Philadelphia
Historic American Buildings Survey in Philadelphia
1950s architecture in the United States
Streamline Moderne architecture in Pennsylvania
Stripped Classical architecture in the United States